is a Tokyu Meguro Line station located in Setagaya, Tokyo.

Station layout
The station is at ground floor level, and access to the platforms are by ramps. There are two entrances, one on either side of the level crossing where the line crosses Jiyū-dōri: one for platform 1, the other for platforms 2 and 3. Passengers must choose their direction of travel before passing through the ticket gates, as there is no footbridge or underpass between the platforms.

This station consists of one side platform and one island platform serving three tracks.

History
The station opened on March 11, 1923.

Traffic

References

Tokyu Meguro Line
Stations of Tokyu Corporation
Railway stations in Tokyo
Railway stations in Japan opened in 1923